Fıstıqlı (also, Fıstıklı, Fısdıqlı, Fistiali, and Fystykhly) is a village and municipality in the Qakh Rayon of Azerbaijan.  It has a population of 262.

References 

Populated places in Qakh District